Miguel Ángel Junco Martínez (born 18 March 1993), commonly known as Mika, is a Spanish footballer who plays for Finnish club KTP as a forward.

Club career
Born in Santander, Cantabria, Mika was a Racing de Santander youth graduate. Shortly after making his debuts as a senior with the reserves in Tercera División, he left the club and went on a trial at FC Luzern in Switzerland.

On 22 February 2013, after scoring a hat-trick in a friendly, Mika signed a two-and-a-half-year contract with the Swiss club. However, he would only appear with the reserves in 1. Liga Classic, and left the club in January 2015 after joining UM Escobedo.

On 5 August 2015, Mika joined SD Huesca and was immediately assigned to the farm team also in the fourth tier. On 4 June 2016, after scoring 19 goals for the B-side, he made his professional debut by coming on as a late substitute for Héctor Figueroa in a 1–0 Segunda División home win against CD Lugo.

On 7 September 2016, Mika signed for CD Sariñena also in the fourth tier.

On 25 March 2022, Mika returned to KTP in Finland for the 2022 season.

References

External links

1993 births
Living people
Spanish footballers
Spanish expatriate footballers
Footballers from Santander, Spain
Association football forwards
Segunda División players
Segunda División B players
Tercera División players
Ykkönen players
Rayo Cantabria players
AD Almudévar players
SD Huesca footballers
CD Tudelano footballers
FC Luzern players
Marino de Luanco footballers
Xerez Deportivo FC footballers
Kotkan Työväen Palloilijat players
Spanish expatriate sportspeople in Switzerland
Spanish expatriate sportspeople in Finland
Spanish expatriate sportspeople in Cambodia
Expatriate footballers in Switzerland
Expatriate footballers in Finland
Expatriate footballers in Cambodia